Ecoregions of Canada may refer to:
Ecozones of Canada, Environment and Climate Change Canada system
List of ecoregions in Canada (WWF), World Wildlife Fund system